Bring Me the Head of Mavis Davis is a British comedy film directed by John Henderson, originally released in 1997. The film stars Rik Mayall, Jane Horrocks, Danny Aiello and Ross Boatman. The title and plot reference Peckinpah's Bring Me the Head of Alfredo Garcia. It was entered into the 20th Moscow International Film Festival.

Plot
Record-company owner Marty Starr (Rik Mayall) concludes that Marla Dorland, aka Mavis Davis (Jane Horrocks) is a fading star. Meanwhile, he has to meet alimony payments to his ex (Jaclyn Mendoza), while he's forced to promote the untalented son of a mobster, Rathbone (Danny Aiello). To get out from under, Marty decides that the death of Marla/Mavis could jolt record sales by turning her into a legend. He hires hitman Clint (Marc Warren), but eliminating Mavis turns out to be more difficult than they thought.

Cast
 Rik Mayall as Marty Starr
 Jane Horrocks as Mavis Davis
 Danny Aiello as Mr. Rathbone
 Ronald Pickup as Percy Stone
 Philip Martin Brown as Inspector Furse
 Heathcote Williams as Jeff
 Marc Warren as Clint
 Mark Heap as Duncan
 Paul Keating as Paul Rathbone
 Ross Boatman as Rock Star

References

External links
 
 

1997 films
Goldcrest Films films
1990s black comedy films
British black comedy films
Films set in England
Films scored by Christopher Tyng
1997 comedy films
Films directed by John Henderson (director)
1990s English-language films
1990s British films